Huang Jianwei or Jianwei Huang may refer to:

Jag Huang, or Huang Jianwei, Taiwanese actor
Europa Huang, or Huang Jianwei, Taiwanese singer-songwriter; see also Golden Melody Award for Best New Artist
Jianwei Huang, Chinese engineering researcher and educator